Southwark South East may refer to:
Southwark South East (London County Council constituency)
Southwark South East (UK Parliament constituency)